The Greatest Mother of 'em All is a 1969 short film made by Robert Aldrich.

Plot
Stage mother Dolly Murdock (Ann Sothern) uses the attractiveness of her teenage daughter Tricia (Alexandra Hay) for her own economic gains, leading Tricia to experience a nightmarish loss of innocence.

Cast
Peter Finch as Sean Howard
Ann Sothern as Dolly Murdock
Alexandra Hay as Tricia Murdock
Katherine Woodville as Eva Frazer
Barry Russo as Gene Frazer
Peter Hooten as Jack
Michael Fox as night club comedian
Angela Carter as night club waitress

Production
The film was loosely inspired by the relationship between Errol Flynn and Beverly Aadland.

In October 1967, Robert Aldrich signed a four picture contract with ABC Pictures to make The Killing of Sister George, The Greatest Mother of 'Em All, Too Late the Hero and What Ever Happened to Aunt Alice?

In January 1969, it was reported Leon Griffiths was writing the script. Griffiths rewrite of a 1965 screenplay by A. I. Bezzerides was completed on May 19, 1969.

ABC were reluctant to finance the feature after the box office failure of Aldrich's last film about Hollywood, The Legend of Lylah Clare. Aldrich decided to make a "long trailer" for the film, a 20-minute short to encourage them to provide the money. In particular, he wanted to demonstrate the ability of the girl he wanted to play the lead, Alexandra Hay. "She carries the picture," he said.

It was only the second time Aldrich tested for one of his films, the first being Ursula Andress and Richard Jaeckel on 4 for Texas (1963).

Filming started in July 28, 1969 and ended on August 8.  There were two days of rehearsals and eight days of filming - five days of interiors at the Aldrich Studios and three days of exteriors at Zuma Beach, the Los Angeles Zoo, Sunset Strip and Griffith Park. The original budget was announced as $75,000, but the final cost was $140,000.

Aldrich said he deliberately used "very stylistic sets" to "reassure" the cast that "not one inch of this test footage would wind up in the movie."

The film did not succeed in attracting finance for a feature. Aldrich said in 1972 they made the movie "just at the time that everybody was getting very sanctimonious about sex pictures... I think it's pretty good. But nobody wanted this thing about a broken-down Hollywood director who found a 16 year old girl and shacked up with her and had a heart attack, etc. We spent $90,000 getting it mounted to show people what it was all about, which I thought was an ingenious piece of showmanship, but nobody else agreed with me. I also think that it was very stupid timing. If I had been bright enough, I would have known that the cycle had passed. Whereas a year before that picture would have sold like hotcakes. So no more war pictures and no more "Hollywood" pictures for a while. I'm a sucker for them. I can't find any; and I'm trying not to look."

References

External links
The Greatest Mother of 'em All at IMDb
Greatest Mother of 'em All at BFI

American short films
Films directed by Robert Aldrich
1970 films